Minke Smeets (née Smabers; born 22 March 1979 in The Hague, South Holland) is a field hockey midfielder from the Netherlands. Her current team is Laren.

She was part of the team that won the 2007 Champions Trophy. During the Champions Trophy she became the all-time record holder in caps for the national team, wearing the orange jersey for the 235th time in her career in the final, breaking Mijntje Donners' record. She won an Olympic gold medal with the Dutch team by beating China in the final of the 2008 Summer Olympics in Beijing.

During the closing ceremony of the 2008 Olympics, her boyfriend, the Dutch baseball team's catcher, Tjerk Smeets, proposed, and Minke accepted. Her older sister Hanneke was also a Dutch international.

Notes

External links
 
 Dutch Hockey Federation

1979 births
Living people
Dutch female field hockey players
Field hockey players at the 2000 Summer Olympics
Field hockey players at the 2004 Summer Olympics
Field hockey players at the 2008 Summer Olympics
Medalists at the 2000 Summer Olympics
Medalists at the 2004 Summer Olympics
Medalists at the 2008 Summer Olympics
Olympic bronze medalists for the Netherlands
Olympic field hockey players of the Netherlands
Olympic gold medalists for the Netherlands
Olympic silver medalists for the Netherlands
Field hockey players from The Hague
Olympic medalists in field hockey